This is a list of notable alumni of Ball State University.

Arts, literature, and entertainment
Bridget Bobel, Miss Indiana USA 2006
Ellen Bryan, Miss Ohio 2011
Claire Buffie, Miss New York 2010
Angelin Chang, Grammy-award-winning classical pianist
Brian Collins, reporter at KXXV-TV in Waco, Texas; best known for "Boom Goes the Dynamite" viral video.
Frances Currey (1925-2012), artist
Jim Davis, cartoonist of Garfield
Philip F. Deaver, writer and poet who graduated from St. Joseph's College in 1968; O. Henry and Flannery O'Connor awards winner
Andy Devine (1905-1977), actor, Stagecoach
Joyce DeWitt, actress in Three's Company
Ashley C. Ford, writer for BuzzFeed, ELLE and others
Danny Gaither, Christian singer, best known for his work with the Bill Gaither Trio
Stedman Graham, publicist and author; long-time companion of Oprah Winfrey
Scott Halberstadt, actor in Nickelodeon's Drake & Josh
Doug Jones, actor in Hellboy, Pan's Labyrinth, Hocus Pocus, and "Mac Tonight"
David Letterman, retired host of the Late Show with David Letterman; The Letterman Foundation for Courtesy and Grooming has been a repeated contributor to the University
Mike Lopresti, national sportswriter for Gannett News Service
Cheryl Anne Lorance, artist
David Loughery, screenwriter and film producer 
Larry Monroe (1942-2014), radio personality
Anthony Montgomery, actor, Star Trek: Enterprise, General Hospital
Sister Edith Pfau (1915-2001), painter, sculptor, and art educator
Sam Smith, journalist for the Chicago TribuneKim Sun-a (김선아), South Korean actress in She's on Duty and My Name is Kim Sam SoonTiara Thomas, R&B singer, featured on Wale's 2013 song "Bad", which peaked at #31 on the Billboard Hot 100
Nelly Vuksic, Argentine conductor and musician
Bill Wallace, dominant kickboxer of the 1970s; starred in A Force of One and The ProtectorCynda Williams, actress in Mo' Better Blues and One False MoveBusiness
Angela Ahrendts, senior vice president of retail, Apple. Formerly CEO of Burberry
Brian Gallagher, president and CEO of United Way Worldwide
Craig Hartman, honorary doctorate, architect and partner at Skidmore, Owings & Merrill
Peter Jubeck, founder of Sir Pizza of Michigan and Clara's restaurants
Kent C. Nelson, retired president and CEO of UPS
John Schnatter, founder and former chairman of Papa John's Pizza restaurants

Politics and government
Amanda Carpenter, national reporter for TownHall.com and Senior Communications Advisor and Speechwriter for Senator Ted Cruz
Jeffrey D. Feltman, United Nations Under-Secretary-General for Political Affairs and former United States Ambassador to Lebanon
Suzette Kimball, 16th Director of the United States Geological Survey (USGS), a bureau of the United States Department of the Interior
Brent McMillan, national Political Director for the Green Party
Rodney C. Moen, Wisconsin State Senator
Richard Mourdock, Indiana Treasurer of State
Frank J. Mrvan, U.S. Representative from Indiana (2021-)
John Rarick (1924-2009), U.S. Representative from Louisiana (1967-1975)

Sports

NFL
Blaine Bishop, former NFL player, Tennessee Titans 
Robert Brewster, NFL player (OT), Dallas Cowboys 
Rush Brown, NFL player (defensive lineman), St. Louis Cardinals
Corey Croom, NFL player (running back), New England Patriots
Jerome Davis, former NFL player, Detroit Lions
Reggie Hodges, NFL player (P), Tennessee Titans 
Ed Konopasek, former NFL player (OT), Green Bay Packers 
Brad Maynard, NFL player (punter), Chicago Bears 
Keith McKenzie, former NFL player (DE), Green Bay Packers 
Bernie Parmalee, former NFL player, Miami Dolphins; current running backs coach for the NFL Oakland Raiders 
Danny Pinter, NFL player (center), Indianapolis Colts
Dante Ridgeway, NFL player (wide receiver), New York Jets 
Terry Schmidt, former NFL player, NO Saints, Chicago Bears 
Shafer Suggs, former NFL player, NY Jets
Willie Snead, Wide Receiver, Baltimore Ravens

NBA
Theron Smith, NBA basketball player (small forward), Charlotte Bobcats 
Bonzi Wells, NBA basketball player (shooting guard /small forward), New Orleans Hornets

MLB
Larry Bigbie, MLB baseball player (outfielder), St. Louis Cardinals 
Bryan Bullington, MLB baseball player (pitcher), Pittsburgh Pirates, Cleveland Indians, and Toronto Blue Jays 
Jeremy Hazelbaker, MLB baseball player (outfielder), St. Louis Cardinals, Arizona Diamondbacks
Thomas Howard, 11-year MLB baseball player (outfielder), Cincinnati Reds, St. Louis Cardinals, San Diego Padres, Cleveland Indians, Houston Astros, Los Angeles Dodgers (1990-2000) 
Merv Rettenmund, NFL draft pick (Dallas Cowboys), 13-year MLB baseball player (outfielder), Baltimore Orioles, Cincinnati Reds, San Diego Padres, California Angels (1968-1980) 
Brad Snyder, baseball player (outfielder), Chicago Cubs
Zach Plesac, baseball player (pitcher), Cleveland Indians

Other athletes
 Marcus Norris (born 1974), basketball player, 2003-04 Israeli Basketball Premier League Defensive Player of the Year
John Paul, racing driver
Sunungura Rusununguko, Arena Football League player
Jamill Smith, Ottawa Redblacks player
 Terrence Watson (born 1987), American-Israeli basketball player for Hapoel Eilat of the Israeli Premier League
Latasha Jenkins, Nike, track and field (200m sprinter- Collegiate National Champion in 1999 and World Championship Silver Medalist in 2001)

Other
Bill Doba, football coach at Washington State University 
David Haugh, sports columnist for Chicago TribuneBrady Hoke, former head football coach, University of Michigan, San Diego State University and Ball State University 
Jon Hoke, assistant football coach with the Chicago Bears 
Ray McCallum, basketball coach at University of Detroit Mercy, Ball State, and University of Houston
Mark Patrick, sports radio personality 
Kelly Sheffield, volleyball coach at Wisconsin, also coached at Albany 2001-2007 and Dayton 2008-2012
Dave Shondell, women's volleyball coach at Purdue 
Don Shondell, ESPN and ABC collegiate volleyball commentator 
Craig Skinner, women's volleyball coach at Kentucky
Jason Whitlock, commentator for Fox Sports One, former sports columnist for The Kansas City Star,'' AOL Sports, and ESPN.com

References 

 
Lists of people by university or college in Indiana